Nelson Araujo (born October 24, 1987) is an American politician. He served as a Democratic member of the Nevada Assembly.

Early life
Araujo was born in Las Vegas, Nevada in 1987. His parents were refugees from the Salvadoran Civil War. He was raised by his mother, who worked as a housekeeper in a hotel.

Araujo earned a B.A. and M.P.A. from the University of Nevada, Las Vegas (UNLV).

Career
Araujo started working for Senator Harry Reid in 2007. He subsequently worked for the United Way of Southern Nevada.

Araujo has served as a member of the Nevada Assembly since 2015.

Araujo announced that he is seeking the office of Nevada Secretary of State in 2018. Araujo said in a statement he's running because he wants to ensure that Nevadans have a voting system "that protects the fundamental right of every eligible voter to have their vote counted, no matter who they are or what they believe." He very narrowly lost to incumbent Republican Barbara Cegavske by a margin of around 5,000 votes, or 0.56%.

References

External links
 Campaign website

1987 births
Living people
21st-century American politicians
American politicians of Salvadoran descent
Candidates in the 2018 United States elections
Hispanic and Latino American state legislators in Nevada
Gay politicians
LGBT state legislators in Nevada
Democratic Party members of the Nevada Assembly
Politicians from Carson City, Nevada
Politicians from Las Vegas
University of Nevada, Las Vegas alumni